Windows Photo Viewer (formerly Windows Picture and Fax Viewer) is an image viewer included with the Windows NT family of operating systems. It was first included with Windows XP and Windows Server 2003 under its former name. It was temporarily replaced with Windows Photo Gallery in Windows Vista, but was reinstated in Windows 7. This program succeeds Imaging for Windows. In Windows 10, it is deprecated in favor of a Universal Windows Platform app called Photos, although it can be brought back with a registry tweak.

Windows Photo Viewer can show individual pictures, display all pictures in a folder as a slide show, reorient them in 90° increments, print them either directly or via an online print service, send them in e-mail or burn them to a disc. Windows Photo Viewer supports images in BMP, JPEG, JPEG XR (formerly HD Photo), PNG, ICO, GIF and TIFF file formats.

Evolution
Compared to Windows Picture and Fax Viewer, changes have been made to the graphical user interface in Windows Photo Viewer.

Whereas Windows Picture and Fax Viewer uses GDI+, Windows Photo Viewer uses Windows Imaging Component (WIC) and takes advantage of Windows Display Driver Model.

Although GIF files are supported in Windows Photo Viewer, whereas Windows Picture and Fax Viewer displays animated GIFs, Windows Photo Viewer only displays the first frame. Windows Picture and Fax Viewer was also capable of viewing multi-page TIFF files, (except those that employ JPEG compression) as well as annotating the TIFF files. Windows Photo Viewer, on the other hand, has added support for JPEG XR file format and ICC profiles.

In Windows 10 and Windows 11 
In support documentation, Microsoft states that Windows Photo Viewer is not part of Windows 10, and a user still has it only if they upgraded from Windows 7 or 8.1. However, it can be brought back in Windows 10 and Windows 11 with registry editing, by adding the appropriate entries ("capabilities") in HKEY_LOCAL_MACHINE\SOFTWARE\Microsoft\Windows Photo Viewer\Capabilities\FileAssociations. It is also possible to restore the Preview option in the context menu. Windows Photo Viewer itself remains built-in, and is set as default for the Tagged Image File Format files (.tif).

See also
 Imaging for Windows
 Comparison of image viewers

References

External links
 
 Windows Picture and Fax Viewer overview
 

Discontinued Windows components
Image viewers
Windows components